Montilaira is a monotypic genus of North American dwarf spiders containing the single species, Montilaira uta. It was first described by Ralph Vary Chamberlin in 1921, and has only been found in the United States.

See also
 List of Linyphiidae species (I–P)

References

Linyphiidae
Monotypic Araneomorphae genera
Spiders of the United States